The Yabutian or Jabutian languages are two similar moribund languages of southern Rondônia, Brazil, namely Arikapú (Maxubí) and Djeoromitxi (Yabutí/Jabotí). They are members of the Macro-Je language family.

Vocabulary
Loukotka (1968) lists the following basic vocabulary items for Yabutian language varieties.

{| class="wikitable sortable"
! gloss !! Yabutí !! Aricapú !! Mashubi
|-
! one
| nichi || owá || 
|-
! two
| yämbo || krokro || 
|-
! three
|  || kamekü || 
|-
! ear
| hi-nĩpí || chi-nipoaró || chi-nipuré
|-
! tooth
| hi-dö || shi-shakriá || maishambishi
|-
! hand
| hi-nikú || chi-nuhu || chi-nikaimu
|-
! woman
| páko || pakohä || chininika
|-
! water
| bzirú || bi || yú
|-
! fire
| pichä || pikö || piku
|-
! sun
| tõhõ || töhã || tadzyó
|-
! maize
| tsitsi || chichi || kokoví
|-
! tapir
| huá || nowö || chimoré
|-
! house
| híkö || arikó || erikoná
|}

Proto-language

Proto-Jabutí reconstructions by van der Voort (2007):

For a list of Proto-Jabutí reconstructions by Nikulin (2020), see the corresponding Portuguese article.

References

Further reading

 Fabre, Alain (2005). Diccionario etnolingüístico y guía bibliográfica de los pueblos indígenas sudamericanos: JABUTI.
 Ribeiro, Eduardo & Hein van der Voort. 2010. "Nimuendajú was right: The inclusion of the Jabutí language family in the Macro-Jê stock." International Journal of American Linguistics, 76(4), pp. 517-570. DOI: https://doi.org/10.1086/658056.

External links
 Amazonian Languages of Rondônia and Bolivia

 
Nuclear Macro-Jê languages
Languages of Brazil
Indigenous languages of South America (Central)